"E My Sports" is the seventeenth episode of the thirtieth season of the American animated television series The Simpsons, and the 656th episode overall. It aired in the United States on Fox on March 17, 2019.

Plot

The family is peacefully enjoying some board games with Patty and Selma on a rainy day, which they all find strange until they realize it is because Bart is not with them. Homer reveals that he bribed Bart into behaving better by buying him a gaming computer after Bart jammed the ice cream machine at a mall food court. Bart has been using the computer to play a game called Conflict of Enemies with Milhouse, Sophie, Nelson and Martin. At Marge's insistence, Homer attempts to get Bart to play less, but when he realizes they are playing for a $1,000 prize, he relents. The team wins and Homer begins coaching the team, who soon qualifies for the World Championship in Seoul, South Korea with a $500,000 grand prize.

Lisa begs Marge to bring her along to Seoul, seeing an opportunity to fulfill her desire to visit the Jogyesa Temple. At the monastery, Lisa achieves Zen and teaches this to Homer, who then realizes the futility of material gain and sabotages the tournament by cutting off all power to the stadium, causing Bart to get blamed by his angry teammates for costing them their shot at victory.

Reception
Dennis Perkins of The A.V. Club gave the episode a B−, stating, "If only because of the lessons provided by 30 years of pop cultural scrutiny, The Simpsons’ Esports episode, ‘E My Sports,’ avoids most of the most obvious pitfalls such a storyline suggests. Leading up to the episode, the overlapping group of Simpsons fans and avid gamers were publicly assured that the show had enlisted the folks at Riot Games to ensure that Bart's foray into the competitive gaming world didn't creak with old guy jokes about those kids and their blipping and their beeping, and so forth."

"E My Sports" scored a 0.8 rating with a 4 share and was watched by 2.08 million people.

References

Further reading

External links
 The Simpsons And Riot Games Joined Forces For Esports Episode

The Simpsons (season 30) episodes
2019 American television episodes
Esports television
Television episodes about video games